Symphonica is a live album by the English singer-songwriter George Michael and his only live album released during his lifetime. Released on 17 March 2014 through Aegean and Virgin EMI Records, Symphonica was Michael's first album of new recordings since Patience (2004). Michael's vocals were recorded at the Royal Albert Hall during his Symphonica Tour (2011–12), while the string arrangements were recorded in a studio.

Background
The album contains mostly live versions of songs from his 2011–12 Symphonica Tour, including six of his own compositions (the rest being covers). The album was the final work by both American producer Phil Ramone, who died in March 2013, and by Michael himself, who died on Christmas Day (25 December) 2016. The lead single, a cover of the Terence Trent D'Arby song "Let Her Down Easy", debuted at number 53 on the UK Singles Chart in spite of little promotion. The album debuted at number one on the UK Albums Chart and sold 49,989 in its first week. "Patience", a further song from the tour which does not appear on the final album track listing, was available as a free download for one week only from Amazon.com in the UK to coincide with the album release.

Track listing

Personnel 
Credits adapted from AllMusic.

 Laurence Anslow – assistant engineer
 David Austin – executive producer, mastering
 Tom Bailey – assistant engineer
 Chris Barrett – assistant engineer
 Mike Brown – guitar
 Ben Butler – guitar
 Chris Cameron – arranger, keyboards, musical direction
 Fiona Cruickshank – assistant engineer
 Danny Cummings – percussion
 Frank Filipetti – engineer
 David Finck – bass, double bass
 Olga Fitzroy – assistant engineer
 Niall Flynn – engineer, mastering, Pro Tools
 Geoff Foster – engineer
 Gordon Goodwin – arranger
 Laurence Greed – assistant engineer
 Gavin Greenaway – conductor
 Simon Halfon – design
 Andy Hamilton – EWI, keyboards, saxophone
 E.Y. "Yip" Harburg – composer
 Jay Henry – background vocals
 Carlos Hercules – drums
 Henry Hey – arranger, musical direction, piano
 James Jackman – programming
 Lincoln Jean-Marie – background vocals
 Lucy Jules – background vocals
 Graham Kearns – guitar
 Shirley Lewis – background vocals
 Mark McLean – drums
 Rob Mathes – arranger, conductor
 George Michael – design, lead vocals, producer
 Adam Miller – assistant engineer, Pro Tools
 Rob Mounsey – arranger
 Lea Mullen – percussion
 Phil Palmer – guitar
 Lori Perry – background vocals
 Sharon Perry – background vocals
 John Prestage – assistant engineer
 Phil Ramone – producer
 Steve Sidwell – conductor
 Luke Smith – keyboards
 Ray Staff – mastering
 Symphonica Air Orchestra – primary artist
 Symphonica US Orchestra – primary artist
 Caroline True – photography
 Steve Walters – bass
 Torrie Zito – arranger

Charts

Weekly charts

Year-end charts

Certifications

References

George Michael albums
2014 live albums
Live albums recorded at the Royal Albert Hall
Albums arranged by Torrie Zito
Albums produced by Phil Ramone
Virgin EMI Records albums